Dogs Leg Fjord is an inlet  long in an east-west direction and  wide, lying south of German Peninsula, directly east of Ridge Island and opening on Bourgeois Fjord, along the Fallières Coast on the west side of Graham Land, Antarctica. It was discovered by the British Graham Land Expedition, 1934–37, under John Rymill, and so named because of its shape.

Map
 British Antarctic Territory.  Scale 1:200000 topographic map. DOS 610 Series, Sheet W 67 66.  Directorate of Overseas Surveys, Tolworth, UK, 1978.

References 

 SCAR Composite Antarctic Gazetteer.

Inlets of Graham Land
Fallières Coast